Joseph Anthony Curtatone (born June 28, 1966) is an American politician from Somerville, Massachusetts who formerly served as the city's mayor from 2004 until 2022.

Early life and education
Curtatone, born and raised in Somerville, Massachusetts and graduated from Somerville High School in 1984. He later earned his B.A. from Boston College in 1990, his J.D. from the New England School of Law in 1994, and his MC/MPA from Harvard Kennedy School in 2011.

Career
After serving as an Alderman for the city of Somerville for eight years, Curtatone was elected mayor in 2003. At 38, he was the second youngest mayor in Somerville history. He is serving his ninth, and final, term as mayor. In 2006, Somerville was recognized by The Boston Globe Magazine as the Best Run City in the Commonwealth. On March 1, 2021, he announced that he would not seek another term as mayor of Somerville.

Sanctuary city
In January 2017, Curtatone reaffirmed Somerville's sanctuary city policy saying "will not waver" in the support for documented and undocumented immigrants. The city will not cooperate with President Donald Trump's executive order reducing grant funding to sanctuary cities and changing deportation standards.

References

External links

 City of Somerville profile

1966 births
Living people
Boston College alumni
Harvard Kennedy School alumni
Massachusetts city council members
Massachusetts Democrats
Mayors of Somerville, Massachusetts
New England Law Boston alumni